José Miguel Elías Galindo (born 15 January 1977 in Zaragoza) is a Spanish former professional road cyclist. He rode in 3 editions of the Vuelta a España.

Major results
1998
 1st Troyes–Dijon
2002
 1st Overall Volta a Coruña
2004
 8th Overall Vuelta a Murcia
 9th Overall Volta a Portugal
1st Stage 1
2005
 4th Overall Vuelta a Asturias
2006
 7th Overall Tour de Langkawi
2007
 3rd GP Llodio
 3rd Overall Euskal Bizikleta
 4th Subida a Urkiola
 5th Overall Vuelta a la Comunidad Valenciana
 8th Overall Vuelta a Burgos
 8th Overall Vuelta por un Chile Líder

References

1977 births
Living people
Spanish male cyclists
Sportspeople from Zaragoza
Cyclists from Aragon